The 1998 Vuelta a Asturias was the 42nd edition of the Vuelta a Asturias road cycling stage race, which was held from 12 May to 17 May 1998. The race started in Gijón and finished in Oviedo. The race was won by Laurent Jalabert of the  team.

General classification

References

Vuelta Asturias
1998 in road cycling
1998 in Spanish sport